Hum Log (English: We People) is an Indian television soap opera and also the first serial drama series in Hindi. It began telecast on Doordarshan, India's national network on 7 July 1984, then the only television channel of India. It is the story of an Indian middle-class family of the 1980s and their daily struggles and aspirations.

It was created on the lines of a Mexican television series, Ven Conmigo (1975), using the education-entertainment methodology. The idea of the TV series came to then Information and Broadcasting Minister, Vasant Sathe, after a Mexican trip in 1982. Soon the idea for Hum Log was developed in collaboration with writer Manohar Shyam Joshi, who scripted the series, and filmmaker, P. Kumar Vasudev, who went on direct the series. The title score was composed by  music director Anil Biswas.

At the end of every episode, veteran Hindi film actor Ashok Kumar discussed the ongoing story and situations with the audience using Hindi couplets and limericks. In later episodes, introduced the actors who played various characters in the serial and end his monologue with the various Indian language versions of the words "Hum Log".

Cast and characters
 Ashok Kumar as Narrator
 Vinod Nagpal as Basesar Ram: alcoholic father
 Jayshree Arora as Bhagwanti: the mother, a housewife
 Rajesh Puri as Lalit Prasad a.k.a. Lalloo: the eldest son, unemployed and looking for a job
 Abhinav Chaturvedi as Chander Prakash a.k.a. Nanhe: the younger son, aspiring to be a cricketer
 Seema Pahwa as Gunvanti a.k.a. Badki, a social worker
 Divya Seth as Rupvanti a. k. a. Majhli, aspiring to be an actress
 Loveleen Mishra as Preeti a.k.a. Chhutki, aspiring to be a doctor
 Lahiri Singh as Dadaji: retired military man and the grandfather
 Sushma Seth as Imarti Devi a.k.a. Dadi: the grandmother
 Renuka Israni as Usha Rani, Lalloo's wife
 Kamia Malhotra as Kamia Lal 
 Aasif Sheikh as Prince Ajay Singh
 Manoj Pahwa as Tony: Guy who elopes with Majhli
 Suchitra (Srivastava) Chitale as Lajwanti ak.a. Lajo
 Kavita Nagpal as Santo Tai
 Ashwini Kumar as Dr. Ashwini  Kumar
 Rajendra Ghuge as Inspector Sadanand Samdar
 Aparna Katara as Dr. Aparna
 S. M. Zaheer as Prof. Sudhir
 Vishwa Mohan Badola as Music teacher

Development and production
In 1984, Mexican television writer Miguel Sabido, who had written the popular Mexican telenovela on educational entertainment, Ven conmigo (Come with Me, 1975) on adult literacy, was invited to India. Working with local writer, he helped created the series which tackled social issues like family planning, caste harmony, empowerment of women,  national integration, dowry, alcoholism and drug abuse. Ven conimgo was in turned based on the a Peruvian telenovela, Simplemente María (Simply Maria, 1969-1971).

The cast would meet for rehearsals at 3 pm at Himachal Bhavan, near Mandi House in Delhi, and thereafter a van would take them to a studio in suburb Gurgaon where it was shot.

Reception
During its 17-month run, Ashok Kumar received over 400,000 letters from young viewers, asking him to convince their parents in marriage of their choice.

See also
 List of programs broadcast by DD National

References

External links
 

Indian television soap operas
DD National original programming
1984 Indian television series debuts
1985 Indian television series endings
1980s Indian television series